Eduard Khazbiyevich Bakayev (born 10 September 1978) is a former Russian football player.

His younger brother Mikhail Bakayev is also a professional footballer.

External links
 

1978 births
People from Tskhinvali
Living people
Russian footballers
FC Spartak Vladikavkaz players
Russian Premier League players
FC Chernomorets Novorossiysk players
Association football forwards